= Cherry Hill Historic District (Grand Rapids, Michigan) =

Historic district in Grand Rapids, Michigan, US

Cherry Hill Historic District is an official historic district in the southeast corridor of Grand Rapids, Michigan. The district was formed by local residents who wanted to reduce crime and increase individual home ownership.

Cherry Hill consists of James Street, Charles Street, Henry street, the west side of Eastern between Cherry and Wealthy, the north side of Wealthy between Eastern and Union, Cherry Street between Union and Eastern, and part of Packard Street.

Cherry Hill was historically designated in 1994. The exteriors of homes in the district are reviewed by the Grand Rapids Historic Preservation Commission to maintain historical accuracy.

In the early 1990s, many properties in the Cherry Hill area were in poor repair. Crime, drug trafficking and gang activity were also present. After two gang attacks on residents, 20 neighbors held a meeting decided to revive the old JHCCO Block Club. At a second meeting, the group decided to call itself "Cherry Hill".

The Cherry Hill Market opened in December, 1991. Cherry Hill community organizers started in 1991 a series of home ownership seminars, including workshops that showed home owners how to rehab their properties.
